Apprentice Video is a cross-platform open-source media player, developed as a personal project by Pavel Koshevoy since May 29, 2010.

It is similar to other media players like VLC or MPC-HC, but offers a few features absent from those players (alpha channel preview, timeline looping in/out points, and several options for achieving adequate video playback performance on outdated slow hardware).

The code base is written in C++ using Qt frameworks for the user interface, FFmpeg libraries for demuxing and decoding of audio/video, Portaudio for audio rendering, OpenGL for video rendering, and Libass for rich subtitle rendering. Apprentice Video source code is freely available under the MIT license.

The audio tempo scaling filter developed for Apprentice Video was ported to C and contributed to FFmpeg as atempo filter.

References

External links

Media players
Video software that uses Qt